Nothoadmete euthymei is a species of sea snail, a marine gastropod mollusk in the family Cancellariidae, the nutmeg snails.

Description
The maximum shell size is 9.5 mm

Distribution
This marine species is found off South East Africa.

References

 Bouchet P. & Warén A. (1985). Revision of the Northeast Atlantic bathyal and abyssal Neogastropoda excluding Turridae (Mollusca, Gastropoda). Bollettino Malacologico Suppl. 1: 121–296

External links
 Verhecken, A. (2007). Revision of the Cancellariidae (Mollusca, Neogastropoda, Cancellarioidea) of the eastern Atlantic (40°N-40°S) and the Mediterranean. Zoosystema. 29(2): 281-364

Cancellariidae
Gastropods described in 1960